Over grensen (Over the Border) or Feldmann-saken (The Feldman Case) is a Norwegian drama film that premiered on February 19, 1987. Bjørn Sundquist won the Amanda Award for the best male lead for his performance in the film.

Plot
The film deals with the Feldmann case from 1942. The couple Jacob and Rakel Feldmann try to flee to Sweden with the help of two Norwegian Milorg border guides.

Cast

Bjørn Sundquist as Arnfinn Madsen, a journalist
Sverre Anker Ousdal as Mikkel Årnes, a police investigator
Ingerid Vardund as Rakel Feldmann
Finn Kvalem as Jacob Feldmann
Inger Lise Rypdal as Molly
Øyvin Berven as Harald Sagstuen
Hans Ola Sørlie as a resistance member and witness
Trond Brænne as Paul Plassen
Sigve Bøe as Larsen
Per Christensen as the defense attorney
Jack Fjeldstad as the sheriff
Odd Furøy as a police superintendent
Jon Eivind Gullord as a Nasjonal Samling member
Ella Hval as Mrs. Hansen
Bjørn Jenseg as a shop manager
Ola B. Johannessen as the prosecuting attorney
Andreas Kolstad as Moll, a witness
Arild Kristo as a security head
Heikki Kulblik as a deputy
Aril Martinsen as Swan, a journalist
Ragnhild Michelsen as a boarding house operator
Sven Nordin as Jensen, a witness
Alf Nordvang as the public prosecutor
John Nyutstumo as Bø, a witness
Hans Jacob Sand as a border guard
Vidar Sandem as Kåre Sagstuen
Henrik Scheele as Theo Jerilowitz
Nøste Schwab as the sheriff's wife
Kjell Stormoen as the judge
Terje Strømdahl as Ole Sagstuen
Karl Sundby as Aron Jerilowitz
Erik Øksnes as a farmer

References

External links 
 
 Over grensen at the National Library of Norway
 Over grensen at the Swedish Film Database

1987 films
Norwegian drama films
Norwegian historical drama films
Films about World War II crimes
1980s Norwegian-language films
Films set in Norway